The Appomattox River is a tributary of the James River, approximately  long, in central and eastern Virginia, named for the Appomattocs Indian tribe who lived along its lower banks in the 17th century. It drains a cotton and tobacco-growing region of the Piedmont and coastal plain southwest of Richmond.

Course
It flows generally southeast through the Appomattox-Buckingham State Forest to Farmville. From Farmville it flows in a large arc northeast then southeast across the coastal plain, passing southwest of Richmond and passing through the Lake Chesdin reservoir. It flows through Petersburg, its head of navigation, through the Tri-cities area, then joins the James River from the west at City Point in Hopewell.

History
The English colonists in Virginia at first tried to rename the Appomattox as the "Bristoll River", however this name did not catch on, while the native one did. There are numerous historical spelling variants, such as Apamatuck, Apamutiky, Appamattuck, Appomattake, and Apumetecs, among others.

The Appomattox River was cleared for transportation from Farmville to Petersburg for batteaux from 1745 to 1890 as the Upper Appomattox Canal Navigation System.  Eppington Plantation had docks for larger boats that could carry seven tons to Petersburg in a four-day round trip. Petersburg had a port below the Fall Line that could hold ships which carry 200 tons down river to the Atlantic Ocean.  Port Walthall, six miles downstream could hold larger ships and at City Point, where the Appomattox ran into the James River, even larger ships could dock in the 19th century.

In April 1865 during the Appomattox campaign of the American Civil War, the Confederate forces attempted to burn the High Bridge over the river northwest of Burkeville in order to escape the pursuing Union Army after the fall of Petersburg. The Union capture of the bridge was a contributing factor in the forcing of General Robert E. Lee's surrender at nearby Appomattox Court House, ending the war in Virginia.

Recreation
The river is a popular destination for rafting and canoeing, particularly downstream of the small Abutment Dam (which is a couple miles down stream of Chesdin Dam) in the village of Matoaca to Petersburg near Virginia State University.

See also
List of Virginia rivers

References

External links
VirginiaPlaces.org Appomattox River Basin
Appomattox High Bridge
Appomattox Campaign 1865

Tributaries of the James River
Rivers of Virginia
Rivers of Richmond, Virginia